Kronoberg County is one of the 29 multi-member constituencies of the Riksdag, the national legislature of Sweden. The constituency was established in 1970 when the Riksdag changed from a bicameral legislature to a unicameral legislature. It is conterminous with the county of Kronoberg. The constituency currently elects six of the 349 members of the Riksdag using the open party-list proportional representation electoral system. At the 2022 general election it had 147,910 registered electors.

Electoral system
Kronoberg County currently elects six of the 349 members of the Riksdag using the open party-list proportional representation electoral system. Constituency seats are allocated using the modified Sainte-Laguë method. Only parties that that reach the 4% national threshold and parties that receive at least 12% of the vote in the constituency compete for constituency seats. Supplementary leveling seats may also be allocated at the constituency level to parties that reach the 4% national threshold.

Election results

Summary

(Excludes leveling seats)

Detailed

2020s

2022
Results of the 2022 general election held on 11 September 2022:

The following candidates were elected:
 Constituency seats - Tomas Eneroth (S), 2,332 votes; Monica Haider (S), 1,241 votes; Mattias Karlsson (SD), 344 votes; Katja Nyberg (SD), 11 votes; Thomas Ragnarsson (M), 1,203 votes; and Oliver Rosengren (M), 4,428 votes.

2010s

2018
Results of the 2018 general election held on 9 September 2018:

The following candidates were elected:
 Constituency seats - Katarina Brännström (M), 1,406 votes; Tomas Eneroth (S), 3,860 votes; Eskil Erlandsson (C), 1,900 votes; Monica Haider (S), 733 votes; Mattias Karlsson (SD), 310 votes; and Sven-Olof Sällström (SD), 2 votes.

2014
Results of the 2014 general election held on 14 September 2014:

The following candidates were elected:
 Constituency seats - Katarina Brännström (M), 1,075 votes; Tomas Eneroth (S), 3,964 votes; Eskil Erlandsson (C), 1,920 votes; Monica Haider (S), 1,112 votes; Johan Hultberg (M), 1,624 votes; and Per Ramhorn (SD), 5 votes.

2010
Results of the 2010 general election held on 19 September 2010:

The following candidates were elected:
 Constituency seats - Carina Adolfsson Elgestam (S), 501 votes; Katarina Brännström (M), 2,447 votes; ClasGöran Carlsson (S), 1,226 votes; Tomas Eneroth (S), 3,420 votes; Eskil Erlandsson (C), 2,810 votes; and Johan Hultberg (M), 1,066 votes.

2000s

2006
Results of the 2006 general election held on 17 September 2006:

The following candidates were elected:
 Constituency seats - Carina Adolfsson Elgestam (S), 482 votes; Anna Bergkvist (M), 444 votes; Katarina Brännström (M), 2,005 votes; Tomas Eneroth (S), 2,997 votes; Eskil Erlandsson (C), 2,617 votes; and Lars Wegendal (S), 608 votes.
 Leveling seats - Eva Johnsson (KD), 759 votes.

2002
Results of the 2002 general election held on 15 September 2002:

The following candidates were elected:
 Constituency seats - Carina Adolfsson Elgestam (S), 681 votes; Tomas Eneroth (S), 3,536 votes; Eskil Erlandsson (C), 3,262 votes; Anders G. Högmark (M), 2,474 votes; Olle Sandahl (KD), 1,006 votes; and Lars Wegendal (S), 991 votes.
 Leveling seats - Gunnar Nordmark (FP), 871 votes.

1990s

1998
Results of the 1998 general election held on 20 September 1998:

The following candidates were elected:
 Constituency seats - Carina Adolfsson (S), 744 votes; Harald Bergström (KD), 419 votes; Tomas Eneroth (S), 2,601 votes; Anders G. Högmark (M), 2,883 votes; Lennart Värmby (V), 1,872 votes; and Lars Wegendal (S), 824 votes.
 Leveling seats - Eskil Erlandsson (C), 2,921 votes.

1994
Results of the 1994 general election held on 18 September 1994:

1991
Results of the 1991 general election held on 15 September 1991:

1980s

1988
Results of the 1988 general election held on 18 September 1988:

1985
Results of the 1985 general election held on 15 September 1985:

1982
Results of the 1982 general election held on 19 September 1982:

1970s

1979
Results of the 1979 general election held on 16 September 1979:

1976
Results of the 1976 general election held on 19 September 1976:

1973
Results of the 1973 general election held on 16 September 1973:

1970
Results of the 1970 general election held on 20 September 1970:

References

Riksdag constituency
Riksdag constituencies
Riksdag constituencies established in 1970